Khodzha-Kazmalyar is a rural locality (a selo) in Magaramkentsky District, Republic of Dagestan, Russia. The population was 1,444 as of 2010. There are 14 streets.

Geography 
Khodzha-Kazmalyar is located 19 km northeast of Magaramkent (the district's administrative centre) by road, on the left bank of the Samur River. Filya and Novy Aul are the nearest rural localities.

Nationalities 
Lezgins live there.

References 

Rural localities in Magaramkentsky District